The London Eye Pier is directly in front of the London Eye Ferris wheel on the South Bank of the River Thames in Central London, England. It was opened as the Waterloo Millennium Pier in 2000.

It is served by various river transport and cruise operators.

It should not be confused with the former Waterloo Police Pier, on the opposite side of the river on Victoria Embankment next to Waterloo Bridge, which has since been renamed the Tower Lifeboat Station and has been the base for the RNLI's Thames lifeboat service since 2006.

Construction
The pier was designed by Beckett Rankine and Marks Barfield Architects and built by Tilbury Douglas, principally to act as a collision protection system for the London Eye.

It was one of five new piers opened in 2000 on the Thames funded by the Millennium Commission as part of the Thames 2000 project (the others being Blackfriars Millennium Pier, Millbank Millennium Pier, Tower Millennium Pier, and Westminster Millennium Pier), as part of an integrated transport and regeneration strategy for the Thames led by London's Cross River Partnership.

Services
The pier is served by various services including:
Commuter boat services between Embankment and Woolwich (Thames Clippers)
Summer leisure cruises between Westminster and Greenwich (City Cruises)
Speedboat tour cruises to Canary Wharf and Thames Barrier (Thames Rockets)

Waterloo is a turnaround point for the commuter boat; upriver services call at Embankment, then Waterloo, where they begin the downriver service back towards Bankside.

Connections
Waterloo Underground station and London Waterloo station  
London Buses route RV1

Local attractions
London Eye
London Aquarium
Dali Universe
Florence Nightingale Museum
Big Ben
South Bank arts precinct

Lines

References

London River Services
2000 establishments in England
Buildings and structures celebrating the third millennium
Transport in the London Borough of Lambeth
Piers in London
2000 in London